Matthew Slotover  (born 1968) is an English publisher and entrepreneur. He is co-founder of Frieze, a media and events company, which now includes the Frieze Art Fair, frieze and Frieze Academy.

Early life 
Slotover was born in London and grew up in South Kensington. He attended St Paul's School, London and then studied Psychology at Oxford University. 

His paternal family (originally the Zlotovers) emigrated from Lithuania in the 1930s and settled in Newcastle. Slotover's father, Robert Slotover manages classical musicians including the composer Sir Harrison Birtwistle; his mother Jill Slotover is a children's book editor. Matthew's maternal grandfather, Richard Kravitz was an American magazine publisher who introduced Esquire and DC Comics to the UK.

He first became interested in contemporary art after visiting the YBA art exhibition Modern Medicine, in 1990.

Life and career

Slotover launched Frieze in June 1991 with Tom Gidley as co-editor. The pilot issue featured the first ever magazine interview with Damien Hirst, with a detail of a Hirst butterfly painting on the cover. Amanda Sharp joined Frieze in July 1991. In 1999, he founded Counter Editions, a low-cost, high-volume edition company, with Carl Freedman and Neville Wakefield.

Slotover is chair of the South London Gallery board of trustees. In 2000, he was a judge on the Turner Prize. And in 1993, he curated a section of the Aperto at the Venice Biennale, which included Damien Hirst, Mat Collishaw and Rirkrit Tiravanija.

Through Frieze, Slotover has published the books: What the Butler Saw - The Selected Writings of Stuart Morgan; All Tomorrow's Parties - Photographs of Andy Warhol’s Factory, by Billy Name; and Designed by Peter Saville, a retrospective of Saville's graphic design.

In 2009, Slotover received an honorary degree from University of the Arts London.

In 2010, Slotover debated whether "art fairs are about money" with Louisa Buck, Matthew Collings, and Jasper Joffe for the motion and against the motion Norman Rosenthal, Richard Wentworth, Matthew Slotover. Joffe claims that his criticisms of Frieze Art Fair led to his work being banned from the fair in 2010. Frieze replied that Resonance FM had hung a number of works, including Joffe's, against their agreement with the fair, and that to ensure a high quality level, artworks in the fair are included only via the galleries in the fair who are selected by the selection committee.

In May 2011, Slotover and Sharp announced the launch of two new art fairs - Frieze New York, and Frieze Masters.

In 2010, Slotover and Sharp were placed jointly at number 41 in the ArtReview "Power 100", a list of influential people in fine arts.

Slotover and Sharp were both appointed Officer of the Order of the British Empire (OBE) in the 2012 New Year Honours for services to the visual arts.

Personal life 
In April 2017, the couple unsuccessfully applied for planning permission to build a townhouse just off Barnsbury Square in Islington, North London. They would have had to make a £50,000 contribution to affordable housing in the borough, if the plans had been approved, but the application was rejected on the grounds that the plans constituted an under-use of the land, and over concerns regarding the destruction of nearby trees. In 2019 the planning rejection was overturned on appeal.

References

Publishers (people) from London
Living people
Officers of the Order of the British Empire
1968 births